The Walk of Health is a  long concrete walkway that runs alongside the Kopet Dag mountain range in south Ashgabat, Turkmenistan, near the Iran–Turkmenistan border. The first  of the path was constructed in 1999 by dictator Saparmurat Niyazov, with the intent of encouraging citizens to be healthy. It officially opened on 2 January 2000. Until Niyazov's death, he required his ministers to walk the walkway once every year.

History 
The first  of the Walk of Health was constructed in 1999 by dictator Saparmurat Niyazov. It officially opened on 2 January 2000. Niyazov made his ministers walk the walkway whilst he travelled by helicopter to meet them at the end of the walkway. He feared that his own heart condition would render him unable to walk the entire length. The walkway was expanded an additional  in mid-2000, after which Niyazov announced he would require his ministers to walk the walkway once every year. On 30 August 2004, over 10,000 people walked the walkway, including members of the government. In July 2012, President of Turkmenistan Gurbanguly Berdimuhamedov expressed dissatisfaction with the state of the walkway. He said that the government would look for private investors to maintain it.

Route 
The beginning of the Walk of Health is marked by an archway in Serdar Health Park. As there are no trees in the mountain range to provide shade, the walkway is difficult to walk in its entirety. It is accompanied by metal fences on either side of the path, as well as street lamps so that it can be illuminated at night. Numerous statues and sculptures line the walkway, with pavilions every kilometer for resting. The highest point of the walkway reaches , which is marked by a flagpole displaying the flag of Turkmenistan.

Gallery

References

Footnotes

External links 

Walk of Health at Atlas Obscura

Tourist attractions in Turkmenistan
Hiking trails in Turkmenistan